The Grieving Mother may refer to:
Our Lady of Sorrow or Mater Dolorosa, one of the names of Mary in the Catholic Church
The Grieving Mother (sculpture), also known as Our Grieving Mother, prehistoric sculpture of the  shíshálh First Nation in Canada